Cardiaspina densitexta is a bug species in the genus Cardiaspina, found  in Australia. It is found on Eucalyptus species such as Eucalyptus fasciculosa, Eucalyptus diversifolia and Eucalyptus odorata. This species protects itself in lerp.

References

External links 

 Cardiaspina densitexta at psyllist

Aphalaridae
Insects described in 1962
Hemiptera of Australia